Clichy (sometimes unofficially Clichy-la-Garenne ) is a commune in the northwestern suburbs of Paris, France. It is located on the Seine,  from the centre of Paris. In 2017, it had a population of 61,070.

Located in Clichy are the headquarters of the L'Oréal Group, the world's largest company in cosmetics and beauty, Bic, one of the biggest pen producers in the world, Monoprix, a major French retail chain, as well as Sony France, a large electronics and media company.

Name
The name Clichy was recorded for the first time in the 6th century as Clippiacum, later corrupted into Clichiacum, meaning "estate of Cleppius", a Gallo-Roman landowner.

In the 13th century, the plain of Clichy was used as a garenne ("warren" in English), i.e. a hunting park and game preserve for the exclusive use of the king or a lord. Clichy became known as Clichy-la-Garenne ("Clichy the Warren" or preserve).

Between 1793 and 1795, during the French Revolution, Clichy-la-Garenne was renamed Clichy-la-Patriote (meaning "Clichy the Patriot"), perhaps because the word garenne reminded people of the feudal privileges that the new government abolished in 1789.

After the Revolution, the French administration officially recorded the name of the commune only as Clichy, dropping the "la-Garenne". This is the term in use in the 21st century. But, in many instances the municipality of Clichy refers to the commune traditionally as Clichy-la-Garenne, although this has not been the official name for more than 200 years.

History
Clichy was the capital of the Merovingians during the rule of Dagobert I.

Its church was built in the 17th century under the direction of St Vincent de Paul, who had previously been curé of Clichy.

In 1830, part of the territory of Clichy was detached and became the commune of Batignolles-Monceau. On 1 January 1860, the city of Paris annexed neighboring communes, taking most of Batignolles-Monceau, which now forms the major part of the 17th arrondissement of Paris. A small part of the territory of Batignolles-Monceau was returned to Clichy.

On 11 January 1867, part of the territory of Clichy was detached and merged with a part of the territory of Neuilly-sur-Seine to create the commune of Levallois-Perret.

Population

The population data in the table and graph below refer to the commune of Clichy proper, in its geography at the given years. The commune of Clichy ceded the commune of Batignolles-Monceau in 1830, and reabsorbed part of it in 1859. In 1866 it ceded part of its territory to the new commune of Levallois-Perret.

Immigration

Administration
The canton covers a part of the commune; the other is in the northern part of Levallois-Perret.

International relations

Clichy is twinned with:
 Heidenheim an der Brenz, Baden-Württemberg, Germany, since 1959
 Sankt Pölten, Lower Austria, Austria, since 1968
 Santo Tirso, District of Porto, Portugal, since 1991
 Rubí, Catalonia, Spain, since 2005
 Southwark, London, United Kingdom since 2005
Merthyr Tydfil, South Wales, Since 1981

Economy

L'Oréal Group has its head office in the Centre Eugène Schueller in Clichy.

In addition, Monoprix has its head office in Clichy. Société Bic has its head office in Clichy.

At one time Fnac had its head office in Clichy. In 2008 the head office moved to Ivry-sur-Seine.

Amazon has its French Head Office in Clichy.

Transport
Clichy is served by Mairie de Clichy station on Paris Métro Line 13.

It is also served by Clichy–Levallois station on the Transilien Paris-Saint-Lazare suburban rail line.

Education
The commune has 22 primary schools, three junior high schools, and two senior high schools. The junior highs include:
 Collège Jean Jaurès
 Collège Jean Macé
 Collège Vincent Van Gogh

The senior high schools are:
 Lycée Newton
 Lycée René Auffray

Notable persons
 Olivier Messiaen, French composer, died here.
 Henry Miller, American author, lived with Alfred Perlès at 4 avenue Anatole France from 1932 to 1934.
 Jean-Luc Rougé, 1975 world Judo champion
 Feta Ahamada, athlete
 Audrey Bruneau, handball player
 Carlos (singer), singer
 Rochel Chery, basketball player
 Claude Dielna , footballer
 Vincent Doukantie , footballer
 Karichma Ekoh , handball player
 Gwladys Épangue, taekwondo athlete
 Jeremy Helan footballer
 Julian Jeanvier, footballer
 Moustapha Keita, footballer
 Aissatou Kouyate, handball player
 Souleymane M'Baye boxer
 Windsor Noncent footballer
 Steed Tchicamboud basketball player
 Brice Tutu, footballer
 Jacques Mesrine, French criminal, known as the French Robin Hood
 Thomas Piketty Economist
 Jeanine Claes artist, dancer, choreographer and dance teacher
Moussa Sissako, footballer
Abdoulaye Sissako, footballer

See also

Communes of the Hauts-de-Seine department

References

External links
 
Clichy City Hall
Facebook page of Clichy
Twitter of Clichy
Clichy et la vidéosurveillance

Communes of Hauts-de-Seine